The Macayepo massacre occurred on October 14, 2000, resulting in the slaughter of fifteen peasants from Macayepo in the southern region of Bolívar Department, northern Colombia. It was one of a series of massacres perpetrated by the Colombian paramilitary bloc Héroes de los Montes de María, a unit of the United Self-Defense Forces of Colombia (AUC), to obtain control over the area around the Montes de María mountains. The massacre also involved congressman Álvaro García Romero who was subsequently accused as a possible mastermind of the massacre.

The area represents a centralized strategic path to travel easily to any department of the Caribbean Region. The area had been disputed since 1998 by nearly 80 paramilitaries commanded by Rodrigo Antonio Mercado (aka "Pelufo" or "Cadena") with nearly 300 guerrilla fighters from the 35th and 37th fronts of the Caribbean Bloc of the FARC-EP guerrilla, led by alias Martin Caballero.

Between February 2000 and January 2001 the AUC was responsible for at least five major massacres in the area including the Macayepo Massacre, El Salado Massacre on February 18, 2000 and the Chengue Massacre on January 17, 2001, resulting in more than 100 deaths and 4,000 forcedly displaced people.

The Massacre

The group of 80 paramilitaries entered the area of the Montes de María from the corregimiento of El Aguacate and into the corregimiento of Macayepo where they held 15 peasants and beat them to death with sticks, machetes and stones.

Telephone recording

Investigations regarding the massacre were carried out by the Human Rights Unit of the Attorney General Office of Colombia.

A cassette recording surfaced containing a telephone conversation registered on October 6, 2000 at 18:55 p.m. between senator Álvaro García Romero and a landowner of the area named Joaquín García. It reveals them code talking a priori in reference to the Macayepo events.

References

External links
Fuerza Aérea Colombiana - Masacre de Macayepo
Indymedia.org - Masacre de Macayepo
Semana.com
Elespectador.com - El lastre de DD.HH. que sigue a Luis Camilo Osorio

Colombian conflict
Bolívar Department
Massacres in Colombia
Mass murder in 2000
Massacres in 2000
October 2000 events in South America
Political repression in Colombia
2000 in Colombia